Stadion Sportowy Bruk-Bet Termalica is a  football stadium located in Nieciecza, Żabno, Poland. It is used for football matches and it is the home ground of Bruk-Bet Termalica Nieciecza. The stadium was built in 2007. Due to Ekstraklasa rules the club had to expand its stadium to hold at least 4,666 people. The first match on the modernized stadium was during the 16th round of 2015–16 Ekstraklasa against Piast Gliwice.

See also
 List of football stadiums in Poland

References

External links
 Stadion Sportowy Bruk-Bet Termalica at the official Bruk-Bet website

Football venues in Poland
Sports venues in Lesser Poland Voivodeship
Tarnów County